I Spy (commonly styled I-SPY) is a 2002 American buddy spy comedy film directed by Betty Thomas, and starring Eddie Murphy and Owen Wilson. The film is based on the television series of the same name that aired in the 1960s and starred Robert Culp and Bill Cosby. The plot follows a spy and a famous civilian boxer who go undercover to prevent a gun runner from selling a stolen stealth bomber to the highest bidder.

The film was released in the United States on November 1, 2002. It received generally negative reviews from critics, and only grossed $60 million against its $70 million production budget.

Plot
At Bureau of National Security headquarters, Special Agent Alex Scott is accosted by rival, Carlos, before his next mission's briefing. Scott has to recover a prototype stolen fighter, the "Switchblade," sold to arms dealer Arnold Gundars.

Gundars is sponsoring middleweight world boxing champion Kelly Robinson's next match as a cover to auction the plane. The BNS has contacted Robinson and assigned him to be a civilian cover for Scott's mission. Together they travel to Budapest, where Scott plans to penetrate Gundars' compound during a pre-fight party, and he gives Robinson a contact lens gadget that allows him to see what Scott sees. Arriving in Budapest, Robinson is kidnapped as a test from the BNS, which he passes by not revealing Scott's identity (in reality he simply forgot Scott's name). At the party, Robinson replaces Gundars' pen with a duplicate with a tracking device before confronting his European challenger in the party's boxing ring as a diversion. Scott, posing as a member of Robinson's entourage, enters Gundars' private office and hacks his computer. Robinson unexpectedly arrives, tripping an alarm. They are forced to escape and manage to evade their pursuers by hiding in the sewer, where they begin to bond.

Returning to base, Robinson helps Scott seduce Agent Rachel Wright by feeding him lines from the Marvin Gaye song "Sexual Healing". Scott succeeds, but is interrupted by movement on the pen tracking device. They track Gundars to a bathhouse, which Scott believes is a dead end. Robinson has a hunch that the plane is hidden in the building, leading them into a gunfight with Gundars' men. Gundars speeds off in his car, with Wright in pursuit. Her car explodes and Scott blames Robinson for her death. They engage in a public confrontation leading to Robinson's arrest. Scott returns to the base to find it ransacked, and he convinces the BNS to continue the operation.

Robinson reaches the arena just in time for his fight. Scott finds the Switchblade's hiding location atop a bridge. He surprises Gundars and the terrorists before being disarmed by Wright, who reveals herself as a double agent. As she tortures Scott for the Switchblade's activation codes, Scott accidentally activates the contact lens gadget allowing Robinson to see the dilemma as he battles his opponent in the ring. He gets knocked down for the first time in his career, but recovers, defeats his opponent, and heads for the bridge. Robinson arrives and sets off a firefight, killing many of the terrorists. After Carlos lands by parachute, he infers that Carlos is also corrupt. When Carlos provokes Kelly, he knocks him out. Robinson shoots the remaining terrorists, while their leader, Zhu Tam, and Gundars are both killed by Wright.

Once all terrorists are dead, Wright fabricates a lie that the BNS suspected Carlos was corrupt, so they pretended to team up with him to catch him and convince the others that she is innocent. The confusion leads to a fight between Scott and Carlos, allowing Wright to escape with Gundars' briefcase. Scott and Robinson attempt to fly the Switchblade away, but it crashes into the river due to its gas tank having been punctured during the firefight. While in the water, the pair discover that the terrorists had attached a nuclear weapon to the fighter. Scott realizes the mission is a success after all, and Robinson remarks that he will be recognized as a hero.

Later, Scott and Robinson track down and arrest Wright in Monte Carlo. Scott finds a copy of USA Today with a picture of Carlos in a parade with President Bush. Robinson takes this news hard, refusing to accompany Scott to BNS headquarters for a mission debrief. Scott tells him the agency has perfected a jelly-like substance which allows its wearer to float through the air. Robinson happily agrees to go, and Scott tells another agent to get some jars of jelly and two parachutes.

Cast
 Owen Wilson as Special Agent Alex Scott
 Eddie Murphy as Kelly Robinson
 Famke Janssen as Special Agent Rachel Wright
 Malcolm McDowell as Arnold Gundars
 Gary Cole as Agent Carlos
 Bill Mondy as Mack McIntyre
 Phill Lewis as Jerry
 Mike Dopud as Jim
 Lynda Boyd as Edna
 Dana Lee as Zhu Tam
 Viv Leacock as T.J.
 Crystal Lowe as Beautiful Girl
 Darren Shahlavi as Cedric Mills
 Gábor Demszky as himself

Release
Made on a $70 million budget, the film brought in $33.6 million domestically and $26.7 million internationally, for a total of $60.3 million worldwide. It was the third box office bomb of 2002 for Murphy, following Showtime and The Adventures of Pluto Nash.

Reception
Review aggregator Rotten Tomatoes reports that 16% of 134 critics have given the film a positive review; the average rating was 4.1/10.  The site's critics consensus reads: "Insipid and mirthless, I Spy bears little resemblance to the TV series that inspired it."  Metacritic assigned the film a weighted average score of 35 out of 100, based on 31 critics, indicating "generally unfavorable reviews". Audiences polled by CinemaScore gave the film an average grade of "B" on an A+ to F scale.

Roger Ebert of the Chicago Sun-Times rated it two out of four stars and wrote, "This is a remake by the numbers, linking a halfwit plot to a series of standup routines in which Wilson and Murphy show how funny they could have been in a more ambitious movie."

The film was nominated for three Razzie Awards: Worst Remake, Worst Actor for Eddie Murphy, and Worst Screen Couple for Murphy and Owen Wilson.

References

External links
 
 
 

2002 films
2002 action comedy films
American action comedy films
American buddy comedy films
American buddy cop films
Columbia Pictures films
2000s English-language films
Films based on television series
Films directed by Betty Thomas
Films produced by Andrew G. Vajna
Films scored by Richard Gibbs
Films shot in Budapest
C2 Pictures films
2000s spy comedy films
2000s buddy comedy films
2000s buddy cop films
American spy comedy films
2002 comedy films
2000s American films